San Rafael Airport  is an extremely high elevation airport serving the San Rafael tin mine in the Puno Region of Peru.

See also

Transport in Peru
List of airports in Peru

References

External links
OpenStreetMap - San Rafael
OurAirports - San Rafael
SkyVector - San Rafael
San Rafael Airport

Airports in Peru
Buildings and structures in Puno Region